Ukraine women's national softball team is the national team for Ukraine. The team competed at the 1994 ISF Women's World Championship in St. John's, Newfoundland where they finished twenty-sixth. They have not qualified since.

The women's team competed at the 2019 Women's European Softball Championships, finishing 20th.

References

External links 
 International Softball Federation

Softball
Women's national softball teams
Softball in Ukraine